Thomas Joseph Osler (born 1940) is an American mathematician, former national champion distance runner, and author.

Early life and educationr
Born in 1940 in Camden, New Jersey, Osler graduated from Camden High School in 1957 and then studied physics at Drexel University, graduating in 1962. He completed his PhD at the Courant Institute of Mathematical Sciences of New York University, in 1970. His dissertation, Leibniz Rule, the Chain Rule, and Taylor's Theorem for Fractional Derivatives, was supervised by Samuel Karp.

Career
Osler taught at Saint Joseph's University and the Rensselaer Polytechnic Institute before joining the mathematics department at Rowan University in New Jersey in 1972; he is a full professor at Rowan University.

In mathematics, Osler is best known for his work on fractional calculus. He also gave a series of product formulas for  that interpolate between the formula of Viète and that of Wallis.

In 2009, the New Jersey Section of the Mathematical Association of America gave him their Distinguished Teaching Award. A mathematics conference was held at Rowan University in honor of his 70th birthday in 2010.

Running
Osler has won three national Amateur Athletic Union championships at 25 km (1965), 30 km and 50 mi (1967). Osler won the 1965 Philadelphia Marathon, finishing the race in freezing-cold weather in a time of 2:34:07. In the course of his career he has won races of nearly every length from one mile to 100 miles.  

Osler was involved in the creation of the Road Runners Club of America with Olympian Browning Ross; together they were elected as co-secretaries in 1959 and were among the four first official elected officers of the newly formed club. He served on the Amateur Athletic Union Standards Committee in 1979.  He has been credited with helping to popularize the idea of walk breaks among US marathon runners.

In 1980, Osler was inducted into the Road Runners Club of America Hall of fame.

Running publications
Osler is the author of several books and booklets on running:
Guide to Long Distance Running (a 20-page booklet coauthored with Edward Dodd) was published in 1965 by the South Jersey Track Club.
The Conditioning of Distance Runners (a 29-page booklet) was published in 1967 by the Long Distance Log. It was reprinted in 1984–1985 in Runner's World magazine and reprinted with a new foreword by Amby Burfoot in 2019.
Serious Runner's Handbook: Answers to Hundreds of your Running Questions (187 pages) was published by World Publications in 1978.
Ultramarathoning: The Next Challenge (299 pages, coauthored with Edward Dodd) was also published by World Publications, in 1979.

Personal
Osler has been a resident of Glassboro, New Jersey.

References

External links

Living people
1940 births
20th-century American mathematicians
21st-century American mathematicians
Camden High School (New Jersey) alumni
Drexel University alumni
Courant Institute of Mathematical Sciences alumni
People from Glassboro, New Jersey
Rensselaer Polytechnic Institute faculty
Rowan University faculty
Saint Joseph's University faculty
Sportspeople from Camden, New Jersey
Track and field athletes from New Jersey